Bliss College was an educational institution in Lewiston, Maine.

Notable alumni
 Susan Austin, state legislator
 Aminah Robinson, artist

References

Education in Lewiston, Maine
Universities and colleges in Androscoggin County, Maine
Defunct private universities and colleges in Maine
Educational institutions established in 1897
Educational institutions disestablished in 1972
1897 establishments in Maine
1972 disestablishments in Maine